Willard Bay is a man-made fresh water reservoir in the Great Salt Lake, in northern Utah. The bay was separated from the Great Salt Lake in 1964, and has since served as a source of irrigation water and recreation for the northern Wasatch Front metro area.

Geography 

Willard Bay is a  freshwater reservoir located in eastern Box Elder County, Utah, north-west of the city of Ogden, on the north-eastern floodplains of the Great Salt Lake.

The reservoir is operated by the Weber Basin Water Conservancy District and recreation activities are administered by Utah State Parks and Recreation. Fish in Willard Bay include black crappie, walleye, wiper, smallmouth bass, channel catfish, bluegill, and gizzard shad (which are unlawful to possess). In winter, the area is a wildlife area for watching nesting eagles.

History 

In 1949, U.S. Senator Arthur Vivian Watkins, a Republican from Utah who served from 1946 to 1959, passed through Congress the Weber Basin Project. This project called for the creation of a reservoir to store surplus water from the Ogden and Weber rivers that could later be accessed for use on farmland.

The U.S. Bureau of Reclamation designed and constructed a -high earth-filled dike to create the  enclosure. The dike, which impounds  of water, was completed in 1964 by the W.W. Clyde Company, and was named the Arthur V. Watkins Dam.  The resulting reservoir was then drained of salt water and refilled with fresh, directly from the Weber River. The bay was named after the nearby town of Willard, which itself was named after the LDS apostle Willard Richards.

A bill in Congress, H.R. 839 and S. 512, The Arthur V. Watkins Dam Enlargement Act, was introduced in the 2007 session to authorize a feasibility study to enlarge the dam.  While the bill passed the House of Representatives, it was suspended in the Senate and never became law.

Willard Bay State Park 
Willard Bay State Park is located on the eastern shore of Willard Bay. It features two state-owned facilities. It has 62 campsites, restrooms, showers, full RV hook-ups, and seasonal/transient boat slip rentals. It is only open April through October, and features 30 campsites with restrooms, 24 of which have full hookups.

References

External links 

 Willard Bay State Park Website
 Arthur V. Watkins Dam Photo and Facts

State parks of Utah
Reservoirs in Utah
Dams in Utah
United States Bureau of Reclamation dams
Dams completed in 1964
Buildings and structures in Box Elder County, Utah
Lakes of Box Elder County, Utah
Protected areas of Box Elder County, Utah